Wellston is the name of several places in the United States of America:

Wellston, Georgia, former name of Warner Robins, Georgia
Wellston, Michigan 
Wellston, Missouri 
Wellston, Ohio 
Wellston, Oklahoma